Dangshun Township (Mandarin: 当顺乡) is a township in Jainca County, Huangnan Tibetan Autonomous Prefecture, Qinghai, China. In 2010, Dangshun Township had a total population of 1,878 people: 916 males and 962 females: 441 under 14 years old, 1,286 aged between 15 and 64 and 151 over 65 years old.

References 

Township-level divisions of Qinghai
Huangnan Tibetan Autonomous Prefecture